The 7th award ceremony of the Feroz Awards was held at the Teatro Auditorio Ciudad de Alcobendas in Alcobendas, Community of Madrid, on January 16, 2020. The ceremony was hosted by María Hervás and was televised by Telemadrid.

Nominees
Nominations were announced on 29 November 2019 in Madrid by María Guerra and Greta Fernández.

Film

Television

Feroz de Honor
Julia Gutiérrez Caba and Emilio Gutiérrez Caba

See also
34th Goya Awards

References

Feroz Awards
2020 television awards
2020 film awards
2020 in the Community of Madrid
January 2020 events in Spain